Noel, formally known as Compañía de Galletas Noel S.A. is a food and beverage company headquartered in Medellín, Colombia. It is a subsidiary of Grupo Nutresa.

External links
 Noel Cookies Company Official Site in Spanish

Noel
Companies based in Medellín
Noel
N
Colombian brands